Tempest was a Christian metal band founded in 1985 in Evansville, Indiana. The band recorded two albums on the Pure Metal Records label.

Guitarist Mick Rowe was originally a one-man-band called Travail (e.g. Dashboard Confessional or Five for Fighting), but upon realizing that his name choice not only referred to good old-fashioned hard work but also to parturition, he changed the band-name to Tempest, and that must have been a good omen because the new moniker effected growth in the band's lineup, dispossessing it of its single-handedness and adding namely his brother Jamie "J.R." Rowe as lead vocalist and co-songwriter. Steve DeAcutis also joined on bass guitar and Duane Monk on drums.

In 1987 Tempest signed a recording contract with Pure Metal Records for three albums; however, band members would later learn that Pure Metal actually thought they were signing another Ohio band with the same name. Nevertheless, the contract was signed, and the record label followed through on their agreement. So did Tempest, producing the nine-song album, A Coming Storm in 1987. This debut recording features Jamie Rowe's melodic voice with occasional falsetto screams; lyrics with a straightforward evangelical candor; and Mick's ability to write catchy hooks and perform both crunchy rhythm guitar and fiery solos. The album's production is muddy, burying much of the guitar and rhythm section in the mix.

Tempest recorded their second and last album on Pure Metal in 1988, The Eye of the Storm. On this album, Jamie's former unequivocal lyrics were traded in for those with an ambiguous "you" supplanting references to God in such songs as "True Love (Never Fade Away)" and "Lost Without Your Love." This ambiguity was not an uncommon strategy of the time among Christian bands with crossover appeal like Stryper. Eye of the Storm also brought about personnel changes with Darren Lee taking over bass and Bobby Andrews on drums. The album is dedicated to the Rowe's father, who died the year before its release.

Tempest disbanded in 1990. The album Limited Edition was privately re-issued in 1997 and combined  Tempest's two albums, making it the first time A Coming Storm was available on disc. In 2003, Mick Rowe sold, via his website, a homemade DVD of Tempest's final concert in 1989.

27 years later, Tempest is back. Mick Rowe was the founder of the band in 1985, and now is the one who continues to lead Tempest, he is the only original member of the band right now. Tempest is now joined by X-Sinner Rhythm Guitarist Thom Schultman, Bassist/Vocalist Rex D.Scott (X-sinner, Zion, The GX Project) and Vegas Drummer Ryan O Neal as the official drummer of Tempest.

"Hello God" is the first single by Tempest in 25 years. Tempest is currently recording their brand new E.P. for "Hollywood Collective Entertainment" called The Metal Queen 2016. The E.P. has a cover of The REZ Band favorite Military Man, a re-recording of Golgotha (from A Coming Storm), plus many special guest singers and musicians.

On April 11, the song "Back to the Hill" was published through its page on Reverbnation. While the song "Every Time It Reigns" was released on April 15.
 
Tempest played for the first time in 27 years in the SoCal Metal Fest with bands like Bloodgood, Worldview, Wickeds End, Join the Dead and the guys of Chaotic Resemblance. Tempest was planning a 2016-2017 tour. 
 
Tempest had much planned for 2016 including two documentaries and re-recording both Tempest albums.

Members

 Mick Rowe – lead vocals, lead guitar
 Thom Schultman – rhythm guitar, vocals 
 Rex D. Scott – bass guitar, vocals
 Ryan O Neal – drums, vocals

See also
Jamie Rowe

References 

American Christian rock groups
American Christian metal musical groups
Musical groups from Indiana